Jordi Mas-Rodriguez (born 31 October 1971) is a former professional tennis player from Spain.

Career
Mas made the second round of the 1998 French Open, beating American Michael Sell, before exiting the tournament at the hands of Johan Van Herck.

His only other singles appearances on the ATP Tour were at Florence in 1992 and Barcelona in 1993. He also played in the doubles at the 1994 Austrian Open with Emilio Benfele Álvarez.

Challenger titles

Singles: (1)

Doubles: (1)

References

1971 births
Living people
Spanish male tennis players